Black Peak is a highly eroded stratovolcano comprising a lava dome complex on the Alaska Peninsula of the U.S. state of Alaska.  Also called Black Volcano or Sopka Chornaia, the mountain is located within the Lake and Peninsula Borough.

The latest eruption from Black Peak less than 4,000 years ago produced an explosive VEI-6 eruption that created a caldera.

References

Volcanoes of Lake and Peninsula Borough, Alaska
Stratovolcanoes of the United States
Volcanoes of Alaska
VEI-6 volcanoes
Holocene stratovolcanoes
Inactive volcanoes
Calderas of Alaska
Holocene calderas